The 10th Annual Nickelodeon Kids' Choice Awards was held on April 19, 1997, at the Grand Olympic Auditorium in Los Angeles, California. Actress Rosie O'Donnell was the host of the ceremony while Terry Bradshaw served as a guest announcer. The ceremony is also notable for leading into "Born to be Beavers", the first episode of Nick's then newest Nicktoon, The Angry Beavers.

Performers

Winners and nominees
Winners are listed first, in bold. Other nominees are in alphabetical order.

Movies

Television

Music

Sports

Miscellaneous

Hall of Fame
Will Smith

References

Nickelodeon Kids' Choice Awards
Kids' Choice Awards
Kids' Choice Awards
Kids' Choice Awards
20th century in Los Angeles